Brendan Gamble (born 1966) is an American singer-songwriter, producer and engineer.

A native of Urbana, Illinois, Gamble was the formative figure behind, and second drummer of the post-wave group Poster Children. When Gamble joined the band in 1988, they had played mostly simple pop material featuring traditional verse-chorus structure and 4/4 time signature. Among his creative projects after leaving Poster Children, Gamble was invited to perform with an existing trio—three-quarters of the Champaign-Urbana band Obvious Man—and became the new singer and rhythm guitarist in the group, which was renamed Stark.

Gamble also was an engineer on the seminal emo album American Football, recorded at  Private Studios in Urbana, Illinois, and released in 1999.

Discography

Flower Plower Limited Potential/Frontier Records/12 Inch Records (1989)
The Moon Seven Times (The Moon Seven Times) Roadrunner Records (1993)
7=49 (The Moon Seven Times) Roadrunner Records (1994)
 Sunburnt (The Moon Seven Times) Roadrunner Records (1997)
Heartless Moon Parasol Records (September 24, 2002)
 Parasol Sessions Volume One (Hathaways) Parasol Records (2012)
Stark 2021

References

American singer-songwriters
American male singer-songwriters
Living people
1966 births